Gevorg Ghazaryan (born 5 April 1988) is an Armenian professional footballer who plays as an attacking midfielder or forward for the Armenia national team.

Ghazaryan has participated in 73 international matches, scoring 14 goals since his debut on 14 January 2007. He previously played for Greek Super League clubs Olympiacos and Kerkyra, and earlier for Pyunik.

Club career

Pyunik
In the 2004 Armenian Premier League season, Ghazaryan played for the youth team FC Pyunik, performing in the First League. For the next season, he debuted in the senior first team. On 6 July 2005, Ghazaryan came to the Lernagorts Stadium against the same command, replacing in the half-time interval with Aghvan Mkrtchyan. His first goal for the club happened the following season. On 24 May 2006, in a game against Shirak FC, Ghazaryan entered the field at the 55th minute of the match and, after five minutes, scored his first goal. In the same match, he scored his second goal, having issued such a double (the match ended with the score 7–0).

In 2007, Ghazaryan played in Pyunik for the first round of the Armenian Premier League, then went on loan to FC Banants for the interests of the Armenian youth team. In the first game, Ghazaryan scored a hat-trick. Having played in the second round for Banants, he then returned to Pyunik. Every year that progresses, they see the potential and improve their skills. In 2010, Ghazaryan reached a new, higher support height of his experience. This season, he accounted two hat-tricks and scored twice in the 2010 Armenia Cup final. While Ghazaryan played for Pyunik, the club won the 2006 Armenian Premier League, 2007 Armenian Premier League, 2008 Armenian Premier League, 2009 Armenian Premier League and 2010 Armenian Premier League, the 2009 Armenian Cup and 2010 Armenian Cup and the 2006 Armenian Supercup, 2007 Armenian Supercup and 2009 Armenian Supercup.

On 10 January 2011, it was reported that Ghazaryan went to the preseason camp with FC Kuban Krasnodar.

Metalurh Donetsk
In June 2011, Ghazaryan signed a contract with Metalurh Donetsk, along with Pyunik teammate Marcos Pizzelli.

On 19 July 2012, in the Europa League soccer match against FK Čelik Nikšić, Ghazaryan made his first hat-trick for Metalurh and gave one assist, thus the Ukrainian club won 7–0.

In summer 2013, he joined FC Shakhter Karagandy on loan. In November he reportedly signed a two-year contract with club. He was among the key players as his club made Europe remember its name after an unexpected victory over Celtic in the qualifying round of Champions League play-off.

In January 2014, he was linked with a move to FC Kairat Almaty and he trialled with Eintracht Braunschweig. In December it was reported that Ghazaryan could not reach a deal with Shakhter Karagandy as the club was not ready to pay the previously agreed amount. Eventually, he finished the 2013–14 season with Metalurh Donetsk.

Olympiacos
Ghazaryan continued his career in Greek Super League by signing for an undisclosed fee a two-year contract with Greek champions Olympiacos, while according to reports percentage of a possible resale lies to his agent Mino Raiola. On 30 January 2015, Olympiacos announced the termination of Ghazaryan's contract after half a year at the Piraeus club. It is said that his short stay at the club was ended due to an argument with Spanish coach Míchel, who sacked him from the squad. From Athens, left for another half-season at Corfu island's PAE Kerkyra.

Kerkyra
At his new team, Ghazaryan had the coach's trust and enough playing minutes to prove his value. With one goal and several assists, he was key to the team, except for when he got injured. Injuries and personal motives kept him off the field for some time, but his few games at the island and the solid performances for Armenia national team made Portuguese side C.S. Marítimo purchase his services in July 2015.

Pyunik return
On 14 July 2022, Ghazaryan returned to Pyunik. Ghazaryan left Pyunik on 31 May 2022 after his contract expired.

International career
Ghazaryan debuted in the Armenia U21 national team youth team in the qualifying match against San Marino held on 17 May 2006. In the 63rd minute of the match, the 18-year-old Ghazaryan replaced Armen Tigranyan. This junior match is remembered by many. Having originally won 2–1, it turned out that the Armenian team played an ineligible player. This was followed by regular technical defeat; 3–0. But in the second leg, the youth team won 4–0 and advanced to the next round. One of the goals in the 66th minute was scored by Ghazaryan, opening his account for the youth team goals.

In 2007, he was called up to the senior national team. In the same year, on 22 August, Ghazaryan debuted in a match against Portugal. This match was a qualifier for UEFA Euro 2008. The match was held in Yerevan Republican Stadium and ended a sensational draw – 1–1. Moreover, the Portuguese team had to recoup. Ghazaryan came off the bench for 58 minutes, replacing Hamlet Mkhitaryan. Ghazaryan scored five goals at the UEFA Euro 2012 qualifying stage. He was only outscored in Group B by teammate Henrikh Mkhitaryan and was among the top goalscorers in the qualifying stage.

On 11 September 2012, in a 2014 FIFA World Cup qualifier match between the national teams of Armenia and Bulgaria, Ghazaryan was sent off for hitting the ball on a serving ballboy.

Personal life
Ghazaryan and his wife Victoria met in Sevan. Their son was born in December 2012.

Ghazaryan was also a classmate of the wife of Armenian national and Metalurh teammate Karlen Mkrtchyan.

Career statistics
Scores and results list Armenia's goal tally first, score column indicates score after each Ghazaryan goal.

Honours
Pyunik Yerevan
Armenian Premier League: 2006, 2007, 2008, 2009, 2010, 2021–22
Armenian Cup: 2009
Armenian Supercup: 2007, 2008, 2010

Olympiacos
Superleague Greece: 2014–15
Greek Football Cup: 2014–15

Individual
Armenian Premier League Best young player: 2007
Armenian Premier League top scorer: 2010
Player of the Month in Metalurh Donetsk: September 2011

References

External links
 
 
 armfootball.tripod.com
 

Living people
1988 births
Footballers from Yerevan
Armenian footballers
Association football forwards
Armenian expatriate footballers
Armenia international footballers
FC Pyunik players
FC Urartu players
FC Metalurh Donetsk players
FC Shakhter Karagandy players
Olympiacos F.C. players
PAE Kerkyra players
C.S. Marítimo players
G.D. Chaves players
AEL Limassol players
PAS Lamia 1964 players
Armenian Premier League players
Ukrainian Premier League players
Kazakhstan Premier League players
Super League Greece players
Primeira Liga players
Cypriot First Division players
Expatriate footballers in Ukraine
Armenian expatriate sportspeople in Ukraine
Expatriate footballers in Kazakhstan
Expatriate footballers in Greece
Expatriate footballers in Cyprus
Armenia under-21 international footballers